Todd L. Schuler (born January 20, 1977) is an American politician from Maryland and a member of the Democratic Party.

Background
Schuler was born in Baltimore, Maryland. His father, Leonard G. Schuler, is a business agent for Plumbers and Steamfitters U.A., Local 486. His mother, K. Michelle Schuler, is an office manager at the Career Development and Placement Center at Loyola College in Maryland. He attended Calvert Hall College High School, Spring Hill College and the Tulane University School of Law.

He was active with both the Maryland Bar Association, the Maryland Association for Justice, and with local Democratic Party organizations before his election.  He is active in the Elmwood Improvement Association.  Todd is a practicing attorney.  He lives in Overlea with his wife, Colleen.

In the legislature
Delegate Schuler served one term in the Maryland House of Delegates, representing Maryland's District 8 in Baltimore County. Schuler was a member of the Judiciary Committee and a member of its Civil Law and Procedure Subcommittee since his appointment and a member of its Criminal Justice Subcommittee since February, 2009.

In January 2009, Delegate Schuler became the first member of the Maryland General Assembly to report live the General Assembly Session via Twitter.

Legislative notes

Co-sponsored legislation which would have brought bottle and can deposits to Maryland. 
Co-sponsored and helped pass legislation that increased the penalties for possession of child pornography. 
Voted against the Clean Indoor Air Act of 2007 (Ban on smoking in bars and restaurants) (HB359)
Co-sponsored Religious Freedon and Civil Marriage Protection Act.
Successfully sponsored a legislative bond bill that (along with its Senate counterpart bill) garnered $250,000 to help fund the Storyville Children's Learning Center at the Rosedale Library, a project of the Foundation for Baltimore County Public Library  (HB360)
Introduced legislation to ban plastic grocery bags. 
Co-sponsored Greenhouse Gas Emissions Reduction Act of 2009. 
Co-sponsored legislation to require the state to issue permits to carry handguns to all law-abiding citizens of sound mind. 
One of just eighteen Democrats to cross party lines and vote against the Special Session tax increases of 2007.

Election results

2006 Race for Maryland House of Delegates – District 08
Voters to choose three:
{| class="wikitable"
|-
!Name
!Votes
!Percent
!Outcome
|-
|-
|Eric M. Bromwell
|20,116
|  17.9%
|   Won
|-
|-
|Joseph C. Boteler III, Rep.
|19,586
|  17.4%
|   Won
|-
|-
|Todd Schuler
|18,356
|  16.3%
|   Won
|-
|-
|Ruth Baisden
|18,261
|  16.2%
|   Lost
|-
|-
|Melissa Redmer Mullahey
|18,160
|  16.1%
|   Lost
|-
|-
|John W. E. Cluster Jr.
|18,057
|  16.0%
|   Lost
|-
|Other Write-Ins
|74
|  0.1%
|   Lost
|-
|}

2002 Race for Maryland House of Delegates – District 08
Voters to choose three:
{| class="wikitable"
|-
!Name
!Votes
!Percent
!Outcome
|-
|-
|Alfred W. Redmer, Jr.
|22,884
|  19.61%
|   Won
|-
|-
|Eric M. Bromwell
|20,314
|  17.41%
|   Won
|-
|-
|Joseph C. Boteler III, Rep.
|19,826
|  16.99%
|   Won
|-
|-
|Mike Rupp
|18,755
|  16.07%
|   Lost
|-
|-
|Tim Caslin
|18,553
|  15.90%
|   Lost
|-
|-
|Todd Schuler
|16,277
|  13.95%
|   Lost
|-
|Other Write-Ins
|86
|  0.07%
|   Lost
|-
|}

References

External links
http://www.toddschuler.com/ - campaign website
http://www.msa.md.gov/msa/mdmanual/06hse/html/msa14632.html/ - Maryland Manual Online

Democratic Party members of the Maryland House of Delegates
Living people
1977 births
Tulane University alumni
Tulane University Law School alumni
21st-century American politicians